Razdar may refer to:
 Razdar, Gilan (رزدار - Razdār)
 Razdar, Ahmadi (رزدر - Razdar), Hajjiabad County, Hormozgan Province
 Razdar, Arzuiyeh (رزدر - Razdar), Kerman Province
 Razdar, Rigan (رزدر - Razdar), Kerman Province
 Razdar, Lorestan (رزدر - Razdar)